Pranob Nandy (born 23 May 1955) is an Indian former cricketer. He played 22 first-class matches for Bengal between 1979 and 1987.

See also
 List of Bengal cricketers

References

External links
 

1955 births
Living people
Indian cricketers
Bengal cricketers
Cricketers from Kolkata